O'Brian Gibbons (born 1 November 1970) is a retired Canadian sprinter who specialized in the 200 metres.

Gibbons became Canadian 200 metre champion in 1998. He competed at the 1996 Olympic Games, the 1997 World Championships, the 1999 World Indoor Championships (both 60 and 200 metres), and the 2001 Jeux de la Francophonie.  He also represented Canada at the 1993/95 World University Games in Buffalo and Fukuoka, Japan.  With the Canadian relay team he won a silver medal at the 1998 Commonwealth Games running the 3rd leg.

His personal best times were 6.64 seconds in the 60 metres, achieved in March 1999 in Maebashi; 6.63 at World Indoors in Toronto, achieved in March 1993; 10.10 seconds in the 100 metres, achieved in August 1998 in Montreal; and 20.63 seconds in the 200 metres, achieved in 1998.

References

External links
 
 
 
 
 
 

1970 births
Living people
Canadian male sprinters
Athletes (track and field) at the 1996 Summer Olympics
Olympic track and field athletes of Canada
Athletes (track and field) at the 1994 Commonwealth Games
Athletes (track and field) at the 1998 Commonwealth Games
Athletes (track and field) at the 1995 Pan American Games
Commonwealth Games medallists in athletics
Commonwealth Games silver medallists for Canada
Black Canadian track and field athletes
World Athletics Championships athletes for Canada
Pan American Games track and field athletes for Canada
Medallists at the 1998 Commonwealth Games